Sir John of Brienne (died c. 1296), was a French nobleman who served as Grand Butler of France in 1258.

Biography
Jean was the youngest son of John of Brienne, Latin Emperor of Constantinople and Berengaria of León.

He held the office of Grand Butler of France in 1258 and later the Ambassador to Castile in 1275.

He died in circa 1296 and was buried at the Abbey of Maubuisson, France.

Marriage and issue
John married firstly Jeanne, daughter of Geoffrey VI, Viscount of Châteaudun and Clemence de Roches. They had:
Blanche

He married secondly Marie, the widow of Alexander II of Scotland, the daughter of Enguerrand III, Lord of Coucy and Marie de Montmirel. They had no issue and later separated when she returned to Scotland to aid her family interests.

Notes

Citations

References

Year of birth unknown
1290s deaths
13th-century French people
Lords of France
Christians of the Seventh Crusade
Sons of emperors